The 1824 United States presidential election in New York took place between October 26 and December 2, 1824, as part of the 1824 United States presidential election. The state legislature chose 36 representatives, or electors to the Electoral College, who voted for President and Vice President.

During this election, the Democratic-Republican Party was the only major national party, and 4 different candidates from this party sought the Presidency. New York cast 26 electoral votes for John Quincy Adams, 5 for William H. Crawford, 4 for Henry Clay and 1 for Andrew Jackson. This election marks the last time the New York State Legislature chose the state's electors as opposed to using some form of popular vote method.

Results

See also
 United States presidential elections in New York

References

New York
1824
1824 New York (state) elections